Stygichthys typhlops, the blind tetra or Brazilian blind characid, is a species of fish in the family Characidae and the only member of the genus Stygichthys. It is endemic to caves in northern Minas Gerais, Brazil. Like other cave-adapted fish (e.g. the cave form of the Mexican tetra), the Brazilian blind characid is blind and lacks pigmentation. It is solitary and when kept together in an aquarium, individuals are indifferent to each other.

Initially only known from a specimen collected in 1962, it was rediscovered in 2004 by researchers led by the ichthyologist Dr Cristiano Moreira from the University of São Paulo. According to locals it was relatively common in the Jaíba region until the early 1990s, but generally not seen afterwards as extensive water extraction had significantly lowered the water table, resulting in many wells and springs drying out. This represents a serious threat to the continued survival of Stygichthys typhlops. It is recognized as an endangered species by Brazil's Ministry of the Environment.

Although there are many cave-adapted catfish species in mainland South America, there are only two known cavefish species from other orders: Stygichthys typhlops and the knifefish Eigenmannia vicentespelaea.

References

 
Cave fish
Blind animals
Characidae
Monotypic fish genera
Freshwater fish of Brazil
Endemic fauna of Brazil
Taxa named by Martin Ralph Brittan
Taxa named by James Erwin Böhlke
Taxonomy articles created by Polbot